"Just Be Straight With Me" is the first single from  rapper Silkk the Shocker's second album Charge It 2 da Game.   It features lead vocals from Destiny's Child and production by Beats By the Pound member Craig B. It features Master P . "Just Be Straight With Me" found minor success on the Billboard charts, making it to three of the magazine's charts, gaining  some  success on the rap charts.

Samples/covers

"Just Be Straight with Me" was sampled on track 10 of Bun B's second album II Trill called "Good II Me", which featured Mýa, who later collaborated with Silkk in 1998 on her song "Movin' On".

Charts

Weekly charts

Year-end charts

References

1998 singles
1998 songs
Destiny's Child songs
Master P songs
Silkk the Shocker songs
No Limit Records singles